Öggestorp is a locality situated in Jönköping Municipality, Jönköping County, Sweden with 212 inhabitants in 2010.

Notable people from Öggestorp 
Acko Ankarberg Johansson

References 

Populated places in Jönköping Municipality